Zinc finger protein 727 is a protein that in humans is encoded by the ZNF727 gene.

References

Further reading 

Human proteins